Mehrullah Lassi (born November 24, 1979, Karachi, Sindh) is a former Pakistani amateur boxer best known to win a gold medal at the 2002 Asian Games.

Career
Mehrullah Lassi joined the Karachi Port Trust boxing club in 1995.

He won a gold medal at Asian Games 2002 in the featherweight division.

Mehrullah Lassi qualified for the Athens Games by ending up in first place at the 1st AIBA Asian 2004 Olympic Qualifying Tournament in Guangzhou, PR China. In the final, he defeated China's Liu Yuan. At the Olympics, he tried his hands at a lower division, bantam category, but lost his first bout against superstar and two-time winner Guillermo Rigondeaux. After that, he reverted to fighting in featherweight division.

In 2005, he fought Olympic silver medalist Kim Song-Guk but the match ended up in a draw.

In the 2006 Commonwealth Games, he lost the final to Stephen Smith with final score being 10:20. In his career's last years he used to spar on GEO TV's live broadcast match "EK MUKA AUR" (ONE MORE PUNCH).

He and his fellow countryman Faisal Karim were banned for life for failing the cannabis drugs test during the South Asian Games in Sri Lanka.

References

External links
 Bio
 

1979 births
Living people
Boxers at the 2004 Summer Olympics
Boxers at the 2006 Commonwealth Games
Commonwealth Games silver medallists for Pakistan
Asian Games medalists in boxing
Olympic boxers of Pakistan
Boxers at the 2002 Asian Games
Recipients of the Pride of Performance
Pakistani male boxers
Doping cases in boxing
Asian Games gold medalists for Pakistan
Commonwealth Games medallists in boxing
Medalists at the 2002 Asian Games
Featherweight boxers
21st-century Pakistani people
Medallists at the 2006 Commonwealth Games